Hypotia brandti is a species of snout moth in the genus Hypotia. It was described by Hans Georg Amsel in 1949 and is known from Iran.

References

Moths described in 1949
Hypotiini